Tatanagar Junction railway station, station code TATA, is the main railway station serving the city of Jamshedpur in the Indian state of Jharkhand. It is located on the Howrah–Nagpur–Mumbai line of the Indian Railways. It has 6 platforms and handles around 100 trains each day. The station is planned for major redevelopment at a cost of around ₹ 450-500 Crores.

History 
The Tatanagar railway station was built in the early twentieth century. Sakchi was identified as the ideal site for an envisaged steel plant in December 1907. In 1910, the village Kalimati which was near Sakchi got itself a railway station on BNR's Howrah–Bombay route. The railway became the lifeline of the steel plant established by the Tatas. The name of the railway station was later changed to Tatanagar in honour of its founder Jamsetji Tata. Tatanagar–Rourkela section was the second 25 kV AC electrified section of the country, the first being Burdwan-Mughalsarai (in 1957).

The Tatanagar railway station was built by Nanji Govindji Taunk and his son Ranchhod Nanji Taunk of Nanji Govindji & Sons of Bistupur, who belonged to KGK Community, a  community noted for their contributions in building Railway lines of India.

The city's importance as an industrial hub encouraged travel patterns linking to much of India via the station. During smallpox eradication efforts across 1974 the station became notorious among eradication staff as "the world's greatest exporter of smallpox", exporting as many as 300 outbreaks across India and Nepal. For the duration of the epidemic train services were instead diverted to checkpoints where passengers could be assessed for symptoms of smallpox.

Services 
Tatanagar railway station lies on the Howrah–Mumbai route, and serves routes to places such as New Delhi, Chennai,  and Orissa. It is a large station of South Eastern Railway. It falls under South Eastern Railway zone and Chakradharpur railway division. More than a 100 trains ply this route on any given day. It is one of the busiest trunk routes section of Eastern India. It includes 6 platforms, 5 for major trains while one (platform near the washing line) is used for some passenger trains.

Loco Shed

Tatanagar Electric Loco Shed holds 200 electric locomotives like WAP-7 and WAG-9. It held many WAM-4 (now scrapped or withdrawn), while some of the WAM-4s from other sheds are still seen. WAG-7 locomotives based in Tatanagar Electric Loco Shed were transferred to other sheds.

It is currently holding 38 WAP-7 & 162 WAG-9 locomotives.

See also 

 Jamshedpur
 South Eastern Railway
 Adityapur

References

External links 
 Tatanagar Junction Map

Chakradharpur railway division
Railway stations in East Singhbhum district
Railway junction stations in Jharkhand
Railway stations opened in 1910
Transport in Jamshedpur
Tata Group
Indian Railway A1 Category Stations